Elsinoë leucospila is a species of fungus in the Elsinoaceae family. A plant pathogen, it was first formally described in 1946.

References 

Elsinoë
Fungi described in 1946
Fungal plant pathogens and diseases